This Sinking Ship is an album by punk band Smoke or Fire, released in 2007.

Critical reception
Exclaim! wrote: "The tunes are catchy and it's easy to tap your foot along without even realising you're doing it. The production is excellent, allowing every instrument to shine ... You're not going to find anything new here but it's a fun ride." AllMusic called This Sinking Ship "a fabulous album, whose weighty lyrical discourse is perfectly ballasted by the invigorating music that surrounds it." Alternative Press wrote: "Distinctive hooks, infectious melodies and fist-pumping choruses: It’s all here, and it sounds damn near perfect."

Track listing

Personnel 
 Joe McMahon (vocals/guitar)
 Jeremy Cochran (guitar)
 Ken Gurley (bass)
 Dave Atchison (drums)

References

External links
Music Video

2007 albums
Smoke or Fire albums
Fat Wreck Chords albums